Arthur James Grant (21 June 1862 – 24 May 1948) was an English historian.

Early life and education
Born in Farlesthorpe, Lincolnshire, Grant was the son of Samuel Grant. He was educated at Boston Grammar School and King's College, Cambridge where he graduated BA in Classics in 1884, with a first class in both parts of the tripos and a distinction in Ancient History. He became a University Extension lecturer.

Academic career
In 1896, Grant was appointed Professor of History and English (later narrowed to History alone) at the Yorkshire College, Leeds (which became the University of Leeds in 1904), where he succeeded Cyril Ransome. Upon his retirement from Leeds in 1927 a drypoint portrait was executed by the artist Malcolm Osborne. He proceeded in that year to a chair at the University of New Zealand. From 1930 to 1932 he was Professor of Modern History at the University of Egypt, Cairo. This period was followed, in the words of one obiturist, by 'quiet years in London, filled with fruitful literary activity'. Grant left London during the Second World War, eventually returning to Leeds.

Marriage
In 1901 Grant married Edith Radford (1863–1929).

Death
Grant died in Headingley on 24 May 1948, aged 85.  His ashes are buried with those of his wife at St Chad's Church, Far Headingley, Leeds.

Works

 Greece in the Age of Pericles, 1893
 The French Monarchy (1483-1789), 1900
 English Historians, 1906
 (with H. V. Temperley) Europe in the Nineteenth Century, 1927
 A History of Europe from 1494 to 1610, 1931
 The Huguenots, 1935

References

Further reading
 A. J. Taylor, 'History at Leeds 1877–1974: The Evolution of a Discipline', Northern History, 10 (1975), 141–64.

External links

 
 
 

1862 births
1948 deaths
Academics of the University of Leeds
Alumni of King's College, Cambridge
19th-century English historians
People educated at Boston Grammar School
20th-century English historians